Mae Taeng is a district (amphoe) in the northern part of Chiang Mai province in northern Thailand.

Geography
Neighboring districts are (from the north clockwise) Chiang Dao, Phrao, Doi Saket, San Sai, Mae Rim, Samoeng of Chiang Mai Province and Pai of Mae Hong Son province.

The Taeng River, a river that has its source in the mountains of the Daen Lao Range in Wiang Haeng district, flows into the Ping River, one of the main tributaries of the Chao Phraya River, in Mae Taeng District.

History
In 1892, Khwaeng Mueang Kuet (เมืองกื้ด) was created, and renamed in 1894 to Khwaeng Mueang Kaen (เมืองแกน). In 1907 it was upgraded to a district (amphoe) named San Maha Phon (สันมหาพน), and renamed Mae Tang in 1939.

Administration

Central administration 
Mae Taeng is divided into 13 sub-districts (tambon), which are further subdivided into 120 administrative villages (Muban).

Local administration 
There is one town (thesaban mueang) in the district:
 Mueang Kaen Phatthana consisting of sub-district Cho Lae and parts of sub-district Inthakhin.

There are five sub-district municipalities (thesaban tambons) in the district:
 San Maha Phon consisting of sub-district San Maha Phon and parts of sub-district Khilek.
 Mae Taeng consisting of sub-district Mae Taeng.
 Chom Chaeng consisting of parts of sub-district Khilek.
 Mae Ho Phra consisting of sub-district Mae Ho Phra.
 Inthakhin consisting of parts of sub-district Inthakhin.

There are seven subdistrict administrative organizations (SAO) in the district:
 Sop Poeng consisting of sub-district Sop Poeng.
 Ban Pao consisting of sub-district Ban Pao.
 San Pa Yang consisting of sub-district San Pa Yang.
 Pa Pae consisting of sub-district Pa Pae.
 Mueang Kai consisting of sub-district Mueang Kai.
 Ban Chang consisting of sub-district Ban Chang.
 Kuet Chang consisting of sub-district Kuet Chang.

See also

 Wat Aranyawiwake

References

External links
amphoe.com

Mae Taeng